Steven Handley (born 23 July 1970) is a former Australian rules footballer who played with Geelong in the AFL during the 1990s.

Handley started his career in the Gold Coast at Southport where he was a member of premiership sides in 1989 and 1990. He played some reserves games with the Brisbane Bears before moving to Western Australia and joining WAFL club Swan Districts. A key position player who could also ruck, Handley was recruited to Geelong in 1991. He missed out on selection in the 1992 AFL Grand Final due to a shoulder injury but played in Geelong's 1994 and 1995 teams which lost to West Coast and Carlton respectively. He was delisted after the 1997 season.

References
Holmesby, Russell and Main, Jim (2007). The Encyclopedia of AFL Footballers. 7th ed. Melbourne: Bas Publishing.

External links

1970 births
Living people
Australian rules footballers from Queensland
Geelong Football Club players
Swan Districts Football Club players
Southport Australian Football Club players